Mixed oxidant solution is a type of disinfectant which is used for disinfecting, sterilization and eliminating pathogenic microorganisms in water and in many other applications. Using a mixed oxidant solution for water disinfection, compared to other methods, may have various benefits such as higher disinfecting power, stable residual chlorine in water, improved taste and smell, elimination of biofilm, and safety. A mixed-oxidant solution is produced by electrolysis of sodium chloride and is a mixture of disinfecting compounds. The main component of this product is chlorine and its derivatives (ClO−, HClO and Cl2 solution). It may also contain high amounts of chlorine dioxide solution, dissolved ozone, hydrogen peroxide, and oxygen, from which the name "mixed oxidant" is derived.

Performance

Reactions
Mixed oxidant solution is produced by on-site electrolysis. The concentration of disinfectant output is proportional to the concentration of salt input, voltage, temperature, current, and electrolysis time. A mixed-oxidant solution production system contains corrosion-resistant electrodes or dimensionally-stable anodes (DSA) and is made so that different voltages for electrolysis are applied simultaneously to different parts. In this way, different reactions occur at the anode and cathode poles, and therefore, various oxidizing substances are produced.

In this process, the chloride ions at the anode are converted to chlorine gas. After reducing the concentration of chloride ions, in the presence of ClO− and Cl2 compounds in the solution and applying the required conditions, ClO2 is produced and the final solution is stored.

For generating ozone, the conditions for water electrolysis reactions must be provided. In this case, the following half reactions take place (which is given below), Hydrogen gas is produced at the cathode and oxygen gas at the anode. By increasing the voltage, the anode half reaction is changed and ozone is produced.

These phenomena can be affected by other principles and applied conditions in electrolysis. In this process and during the production of ozone, a highly penetrating smell of ozone within the region of the reactor outlet is clear. By continuing this process and maintaining stable conditions, production of ozone can be continued up to the maximum dissolution of ozone in water. The solubility of ozone in 20˚C water is 570 mg per liter and 1050 mg per liter in water at 0˚C. In the next stage, with little change in reaction conditions, hydrogen peroxide is produced.. For producing ozone and hydrogen peroxide, there are different half reactions with different levels of reduction potential and in practice, each of them may occur.

Imposing various conditions, including changes in voltage, current, concentration, pH, temperature, flow, and pressure will relatively change the standard reduction potential and as a result, the tendency of reactions of various substances. However, the extent of the electrodes in the reactor, creating multiple layers of electrolyte and unequal conditions on the electrodes surfaces, will cause major changes in the standard modes of the half reactions.

Production Cell

The basis of the mixed-oxidants production cell is electrolysis of a water solution of sodium chloride. In the process anions and cations move toward the anode and cathode, respectively, and related reactions are carried out. For producing a mixed oxidants solution, different types of electrolysis cells such as a membrane cell or a standard contact cell (unipolar and bipolar) are used.

Membrane cell
This cell consists of anode and cathode electrodes with an ion exchange membrane between them. This membrane lets cations pass through it and leads them to the cathode. This cell has two inputs and two outputs for water. One pair of input and output is located at the cathode side and the other pair is located at the anode side.

There are membrane cells with different membrane models. In some of them an ion exchange membrane is used which is able to move the cations and anions from one side to the other side. In this type of cell, brine solution enters from one side and water from the other side.

The half reaction in the cathode chamber is as follows:

2NaCl + 2H2O + 2e−→ 2NaOH + 2Cl−+ H2

On the anode side, part of the chloride ions are oxidized and dissolved in the passing water in the forms of Cl2, HOCl and small amounts of ClO2 due to the electrolysis of water. Small amounts of ozone and oxygen gas are produced at the anode side. The main half reaction at the anode side is:

2Cl−→ 2e−+ Cl2

Cl−+ H2O → HClO + H++ 2e−

Chlorine and its compounds have been dissolved in the water passing through the anode chamber, and by injecting the required amount of this solution into water, it can be disinfected. The output solution of the anode chamber in the membrane reactors is acidic and its pH is around 2-3. For this type of electrolysis cell, fixed titanium electrodes can be used to ensure no corrosion at the anode side. In order to increase efficiency and enhance capacity, several membrane cells can be used in parallel.

Membraneless cell 

The structure of the cell without a membrane is similar to a membrane cell, with the exception that it has one brine solution input and one output for the products. In this case, the anode and cathode products are mixed and go to the cell output. Since the pH of the produced solution is around 8-9, using this solution for disinfection may increase the pH; that can be reduced by adding acidic solutions. This type of cell can be unipolar or bipolar.  The structure of the cell is described below.

Types of cell connections 

Electrolysis cells with more than one anode and cathode pair have two types of arrangement, including both unipolar and bipolar.

Unipolar arrangement: in this case the cells are arranged in parallel and therefore have the same potential difference between the anode-cathode pair. The total current flow is equal to the sum of each pair's current and the voltage is equal to one pair's voltage. In this case the whole system voltage is low and its current is high.

Bipolar arrangement: In this case, the cells are connected in series. In the industry, bipolar ordering is done in various ways. In one case central electrodes on one side act as the anode and on the other side act as the cathode. In other cases, part of the electrode plate on both sides is the anode and the other part is the cathode.

Comparisons

Advantages of Mixed oxidant solution compared to other disinfecting methods 

Application of mixed-oxidant solution for disinfecting water has several advantages compared to other methods, such as sodium hypochlorite and calcium hypochlorite. Disinfecting effect of Mixed oxidant is higher than other methods such as chlorination and in comparison to other methods such as Ozonation and using ultraviolet ray, contains residual chlorine in the water. Moreover, it is much safer and causes fewer risks. A summary of the comparison between the disinfection methods is provided in the table below.

In the next table, the effectiveness of mixed oxidant and bleach in terms of deactivating bacteria and viruses has been compared. In almost all cases mixed oxidant is a more effective solution.

Comparison of the membrane cell and membraneless cell
A mixed oxidant production cell generally works either with or without a membrane. Each of these structures has advantages and disadvantages that should be considered. The membraneless cell output contains hydroxide ions which increase the pH; therefore it affects the composition of the output products. To keep the pH in the neutral range, the required amount of hydrochloric acid or sulfuric acid must be added to the disinfected water. In this kind of cell, the main product is sodium hypochlorite. On the other hand, in cells with 1 membrane,  the anode output (anolyte) is acidic and the cathode output (catholyte) is basic. The anolyte (acidic solution) contains more than four types of oxidants, which can make disinfecting more effective. However, in some cases alkaline solution can be added to neutralize the disinfected water. The output components of these two different cells are different and these are compared in the table below.

At pH higher than 5, most of the hypochlorous acid turns into hypochlorite ions, which is a weaker oxidant compared to hypochlorous acid. Moreover, in a membrane cell, other powerful oxidants such as ozone, chlorine dioxide and hydrogen peroxide can be produced, which are effective for killing bacteria and omitting biofilms in water distribution systems and containers.

Today, membrane cell systems are some of the most promising and fast-developing techniques for producing Chloralkali (see chloralkali process) and it will undoubtedly replace other techniques. Since 1987, practically all new Chlor-alkali plants worldwide apply the membrane system. However, due to their long lifetime and high replacement costs, the existing mercury and diaphragm cells are only very slowly being replaced with membrane cells. Currently, in most developed countries by understanding the advantages of membrane systems, manufacturing technologies have changed in this direction. MIOX is one of these companies which has been developing this technology in more than 40 countries and has widely taken advantage of it.

Applications
Mixed oxidant solutions for water treatment may improve safety, lower general corrosion rates, increase performance, and save money. Mixed oxidant solutions may be more effective than bleach and can be used for a variety of applications. Some of these applications are cited below.

Cooling water treatment: Mixed oxidant solution for industrial cooling water treatment and disinfection, improves safety and thermal efficiency, lowers general corrosion rates, and increases performance, and saves money, resulting in a reduction of downtime, maintenance, and expense. Additionally, it can improve workplace safety by eliminating the handling and storage of hazardous chemicals while maintaining steady microbiological control.

Industrial process water and wastewater treatment: Mixed oxidant is the lowest cost supplier of chlorine for disinfection and oxidation of process water and wastewater prior to discharge. Mixed oxidant Solution chemistry is more effective at biofilm control. Biochemical and Chemical oxygen demand removal, breakpoint chlorination of ammonia and hydrogen sulfide removal.

Cooling tower water treatment: Mixed oxidant delivers better cooling tower water treatment solutions to improve cooling tower efficiency and safety, all at a lower cost than conventional biocide treatment methods for legionella prevention, biofilm removal, and inactivation of other performance-inhibiting waterborne organisms.

Aquatics: Mixed Oxidant Solution for swimming pool water disinfection improves safety, increases performance, reduces maintenance time, and lowers operating cost. With minimal maintenance. It eliminates the harsh qualities of traditional chlorine treatment to create a noticeably improved swimming experience.

Drinking water & beverage facilities: Multi oxidant is a proven disinfectant for improving the quality and safety of drinking water with significant economic savings. For providing clean, safe drinking water ranges from rural communities to large cities. Also providing clean, safe water at food and beverage facilities. It is ideally suited for carbonated soft drinks bottling, brewing, dairy farms and dairy and food processing applications.

Municipal wastewater: As one of the world's most precious natural resources, the reuse of water is becoming increasingly important. Mixed oxidant is both the most cost-effective solution and the preferred technology for disinfection and oxidation of wastewater for reuse or reintroduction into the environment eliminating many of the negative problems associated with traditional chlorine disinfection.

Farm applications: such as livestock watering, drinking water disinfection, dairy, milking operations, pre- and post-teat dip, CIP sanitizer, Poultry cooling & humidification pad treatment, irrigation & drip line cleaning, iron and manganese Removal from Water Supply.

Crude oil & gas water management: Enhanced oil recovery almost always involves some kind of water treatment processes. Water treatment technology in the crude oil and gas industry includes disinfection treatment for produced water, frac-water, disposal well sites, enhanced oil recovery, and hydrogen sulfide removal.

References

Chemistry